Events from the year 1634 in Sweden

Incumbents
 Monarch – Christina

Events

 Swedish victory at the Battle of Liegnitz.
 Burial of the dead King.
 Instrument of Government (1634)
 Battle of Nördlingen (1634)
 Ramsele witch trial

Births

 
Tomas Polus, statesman and diplomat (d. 1708).

Deaths

References

 
Years of the 17th century in Sweden
Sweden